The Fort Johnson Volunteer Fire Company is a volunteer fire department that provides fire protection and emergency medical services to Fort Johnson and Amsterdam New York.

History
FJVFC was founded in 1935, and manages two stations.

In 1995, a fire erupted in the home of one of the department's volunteers. David Grandy, a lieutenant of the fire company, his wife Stephanie Grandy, also an active firefighter at the department, and their three children, were killed in the fire. A monument was dedicated to the Grandy family behind station 2 in Amsterdam.

In 2009, the fire company petitioned for a bill to allow non-resident members of their company, sponsored by Senator Hugh Farley. The bill passed in July 2009, making the FJVFC the 24th fire department in the state of NY to receive such an exemption.

In 2011, Chief Alden Miller found child pornography on the company computer, which he turned into the State Police. A volunteer at the company, Randolph Billington, was arrested for allegedly downloading the material. Billington was subsequently also charged with felony child sex abuse.

The department has around 25 active members, and fields over 250 calls per year.

Apparatus
The department has 9 trucks, including 2 fire engines, 2 tankers, 1 tower, 1 wildland fire engine, and 1 rescue. Their original engine from 1935 is still categorized as active, but is not used during emergencies. Both tankers come equipped with an engine, and hold 2,000 gallons of water.

References

1938 establishments in New York (state)
Fire departments in New York (state)